The 2014 Speedway Grand Prix of Great Britain, also known as the 2014 FIM MITAS British Speedway Grand Prix for sponsorship reasons, was the seventh race of the 2014 Speedway Grand Prix season. It took place on 7 July at the Millennium Stadium in Cardiff, Wales, United Kingdom. The Grand Prix was won by Greg Hancock who beat Tai Woffinden, Darcy Ward and Krzysztof Kasprzak in the final.

Riders 
The Speedway Grand Prix Commission nominated Craig Cook as Wild Card, and Ben Barker and Jason Garrity both as Track Reserves.

Heat details

The intermediate classification

References

See also 
 motorcycle speedway

Great Britain
Speedway Grand Prix of Great Britain
Speedway Grand Prix of Great Britain
Speedway Grand Prix of Great Britain